The Austin de Luxe is a family car that was produced by Authi at its Pamplona plant between 1974 and 1975.

The car was styled by Pininfarina, and based on the chassis and various other components of the Austin/Morris 1100.

References 

De luxe
Front-wheel-drive vehicles
Mid-size cars
1970s cars